= The Alternative Story =

Mental health organisation based in India

- Founded: 2018
- Location: Bangalore, India
- Region served: India
- Key people: Paras Sharma and Rashi Vidyasagar
- Website: alternativestory.in

The Alternative Story is an Indian mental health collective which provides counselling services to individuals and organisations based in Bengaluru. It aims to provide mental health services that are affordable, intersectional feminist, trauma-informed, kink-aware, queer-affirmative and caste aware.

== History ==
The group was founded in 2018 by Paras Sharma and Rashi Vidyasagar. Sharma had produced a podcast, also called The Alternative Story, from 2018. In 2022, The Alternative Story was one of 40 national and international organisations to collaborate with Jindal School of Psychology and Counselling in their degree course to provide work placements.

During the COVID-19 pandemic, counsellors from the group spoke about the increased needs for their services, and the mental health impacts of the lockdowns and other pandemic measures as well as anxiety when measures were lifted. Members of the Alternative Story have spoken about the impact on people in India and the lack of robust mental health infrastructure.

=== Services ===
The organisation provides the following services:

- One-on-one counselling
- Pay What You Want
- Conjoint and family counselling
- Support groups
- Training and workshops
- Webinars
- Online counselling
- Certificate course in trauma centred therapy
